FC AK is a South African football club from the West Rand, Johannesburg which was established in 2006. Although the club has been playing its home fixtures at the Eldorado Park Stadium, the club relocated to its place of origin in March 2013. Its motto is "Soli Deo Nissi", translated in English to "In God We Trust".

The club has established strategic partnerships with community based enterprises and professional agencies, and with community based football associations and youth development academies in the West Rand, such as Florida Albion Football Club who currently participate in the Castle League and Bosmont Local Football Association, who focus on youth development programmes for Under 9, 11, 15, 19, as part of their youth development skills transfer and skill development programme.

To further position the club within the West Rand community, from the 2013/2014 season, FC AK planned to occupy the Bill Jardine Stadium in the West Rand as its home ground, to host its home fixtures. The stadium is also home to the Raiders Rugby Club Franchise.

Honours
2009—10 Vodacom League Gauteng Stream champions
2009—10 Vodacom League National Play-offs winners
2007—08 Winners of the National First Division Promotion Play-Off's
2007—08 Winners of the National First Division Inland Stream
2006—07 Participated in the Baymed Cup Finals

External links
Premier Soccer League
NFD Club Info
FCAK

National First Division clubs
Soccer clubs in Johannesburg
Association football clubs established in 2006
SAFA Second Division clubs
2006 establishments in South Africa